The 2003 European Championship of Ski Mountaineering was the fifth European Championship of ski mountaineering and was held in the Tatra Mountains, Slovakia, from March 28, 2003 to March 30, 2003. The competition was organized by the International Council for Ski Mountaineering Competitions (ISMC) of the Union Internationale des Associations d'Alpinisme (UIAA).

Results

Nation ranking and medals 
(all age groups)

Team 
Event held on March 28, 2003

List of the best 10 teams by gender:

*) total time including 3 penalty minutes

Individual 
Event held on March 30, 2003

List of the best 10 participants by gender:

Combination ranking 
combination ranking including the results of the individual and team races

List of the best 10 participants by gender:

References 

2003
European Championship Of Ski Mountaineering, 2003
International sports competitions hosted by Slovakia
European Championship Of Ski Mountaineering, 2003